The track and field competition at the 2011 Military World Games was held from 17–23 July 2011 at the Estádio Olímpico João Havelange in Rio de Janeiro. The programme contained 35 athletics events, 20 for men and 15 for women. The marathon races (held in conjunction with the annual Rio de Janeiro Marathon) took place on 17 July while the track and field events were held in the stadium from 19–23 July.

The host nation Brazil topped the medal table with eight gold medals and fourteen in total. Kenya was a close runner-up, with six golds and a total of fifteen medals after strong performances in the middle to long distance running events. Poland, Qatar and Ukraine were other countries which performed well. Twenty-six nations had a medal-winning athlete in the track and field competition.

The marathon competition returned, after a break at the 2007 edition, but the racewalk and decathlon were dropped. Despite the increased number of women's track events, only three field events were contested by female athletes.

Qatar's Femi Ogunode was the only athlete to win two individual events, taking the 100 metres and 200 metres titles in Games records. Ana Cláudia Silva of Brazil won the women's 200 m and the 4×100 metres relay, as well as the 100 m silver, while her compatriot Geisa Coutinho won the 400 m and featured in both of Brazil's winning relay teams. Keila Costa came close to a long jump/triple jump double, but was narrowly beaten by Simona La Mantia in the latter event.

A total of ten Games records were broken during the five-day competition. Chinese Olympic medallist Zhang Wenxiu won the women's hammer throw in a Games record – a feat also achieved by Poland's Paweł Wojciechowski in the men's pole vault. The men's 400 metres was won by Sajjad Hashemi in an Iranian national record time.

Records

Medal summary

Men

Women

Medal table

References

Results
Track and field results at the 2011 Military World Games website
CISM  Río de Janeiro  BRA  17 - 23 July. Tilastopaja. Retrieved on 2011-08-19.

 
Military World Games
2011 Military World Games
2011
2011 Military World Games
2011 Military World Games